Đỗ Quốc Luật (born 12 February 1993) is a Vietnamese long-distance runner.

References

External links

1993 births
Living people
Vietnamese male long-distance runners
Southeast Asian Games medalists in athletics
Southeast Asian Games bronze medalists for Vietnam
Competitors at the 2017 Southeast Asian Games
Competitors at the 2019 Southeast Asian Games
Southeast Asian Games gold medalists for Vietnam